Meenal Jain (born 14 June 1985 in Indore, Madhya Pradesh, India) was a top 6 finalist in the reality show Indian Idol 2 on Indian television. She was voted out on 28 February 2006.

Life and career

Jain is living in Mumbai for the last 10 years and completed her graduate studies from Mithibai College, Mumbai. Recently, she did shows with singers Sonu Nigam, Abhijeet Sawant, Amit Sana, Rex D'Souza. Presently she is co-hosting a show "Music, Masti aur Dhoom". She also provided the singing voice for Barbie in the Hindi dubbed version of the 2007 animated film Barbie as the Island Princess. She also sang the song "Sakhi" on Aamir Khan's show Satyamev Jayate's seventh episode which was on domestic violence.

Indian Idol 2 performances
Aao Na
Ishq Samundar - Bottom 2 24/01/2006
Lambi Judaai - Bottom 3 31/01/2006
Nigahein Milane - Bottom 2 07/02/2006
Kuch Na Kaho
Mera Piya Ghar Aaya - Bottom 3 21/02/2006
Hum Dil De Chuke Sanam - Eliminated 28/02/2006
Grand Finale: "Woh Pehli Baar", "Right Here Right Now" with N. C. Karunya and Antara Mitra, and Baras Ja E Badal.

Playback in Bollywood 
 Palken Jhukao Na - Sehar (2005) with Swanand Kirkire and Music by Daniel B. George.
 Dua - No One Killed Jessica (2011) with Raman Mahadevan, Joi Barua, Amitabh Bhattacharya and music by Amit Trivedi
 Banarasiya - Raanjhanaa (2013) With Shreya Ghoshal, Anwesha Dutt Guptal
 Cutie Pie - Ae Dil Hai Mushkil (2016) With Pradeep Singh Sran, Nakash Aziz & Antara
 Sakhi - Satyamev Jayate
 Gaye Kaam Se - Laila Majnu (2018) With Dev Negi, Amit Sharma
 Kundali - Manmarziyaan (2018) with Meghna Mishra, Yashita Sharma
 Dostigiri (2018)

References

External links 
  Indian Idol Official site]

1985 births
Living people
Indian women playback singers
Indian Idol participants
Indian voice actresses
Musicians from Indore
Mithibai College alumni
Singers from Madhya Pradesh
Bollywood playback singers
Women musicians from Madhya Pradesh
21st-century Indian women singers
21st-century Indian singers